Ack Ack (February 24, 1966 – November 7, 1990) was an American Thoroughbred Hall of Fame racehorse.

Background
Ack Ack was a brown horse bred in Kentucky by Harry F. Guggenheim and owned by Guggenheim's Cain Hoy Stable. He was trained by Charlie Whittingham.

Racing career
He raced with success from age two to four, scoring wins in the important 1969 Withers Stakes and Arlington Classic. In 1971 at age five, Ack Ack blossomed into the year's most dominant horse, winning seven straight graded stakes races on both dirt and grass courses at a variety of distances. His performances earned him United States Horse of the Year honors.

Following Guggenheim's death in January 1971, Ack Ack was sold by the executors of Guggenheim's estate. The horse won the San Carlos Handicap less than a week before Guggenheim died. New owner E. E. "Buddy" Fogelson, husband of actress Greer Garson, bought Ack Ack for $500,000. In 1971, Ack Ack won seven of eight races and finished second in the other start. He won his final race, the Hollywood Gold Cup, in which he carried 134 pounds.

Stud record
At the end of the year, Ack Ack was retired to stand at stud at his birthplace of Claiborne Farm near Paris, Kentucky, where he sired 40 stakes winners, including champion sire Broad Brush and Youth, the 1976 American Champion Male Turf Horse, which won a combined four Grade/Group 1 races in France, Canada, and the United States.

Assessment
In 1999, The Blood Horse, Inc., selected Ack Ack as one of the top 100 racehorses of the 20th century.

References
 Ack Ack's pedigree and racing stats
 Ack Ack at the National Museum and Racing Hall of Fame
 L.A. Times article about Ack Ack

1966 racehorse births
1990 racehorse deaths
Racehorses bred in Kentucky
Racehorses trained in the United States
American Grade 1 Stakes winners
Eclipse Award winners
American Thoroughbred Horse of the Year
United States Thoroughbred Racing Hall of Fame inductees
Thoroughbred family 9-h
Chefs-de-Race